"Waltz for Debby" is a jazz standard composed by pianist Bill Evans. He recorded it as a solo piano piece on his album New Jazz Conceptions (1956). Lyrics were written by Gene Lees. "Debby" in the composition's title refers to Evans's niece, Debby Evans.

"Waltz for Debby" is known in Swedish by the name "Monicas Vals"; lyrics were written by Beppe Wolgers; and in Finnish by the name "Ankin Valssi"; lyrics were written by Jukka Kuoppamäki.

Awards
Don Sebesky: Grammy Award for Best Instrumental Arrangement (from I Remember Bill: The Tribute to Bill Evans, 1999)
Gary Burton and Chick Corea: Grammy Award for Best Jazz Instrumental Solo (from The New Crystal Silence, 2008)

Personnel
On New Jazz Conceptions (1956):
 Bill Evans – piano

On Waltz for Debby (1961):
Bill Evans – piano
Scott LaFaro – bass
Paul Motian – drums

Renditions

By Evans
New Jazz Conceptions (1956)
Waltz for Debby (1961) (The track also appears on The Complete Village Vanguard Recordings, 1961, along with an alternate take)
Know What I Mean? (1961, Cannonball Adderley with Bill Evans)
Waltz for Debby (1964, with Monica Zetterlund)
You're Gonna Hear From Me (recorded 1969, released 1988)
The Bill Evans Album (1972)
The Tony Bennett/Bill Evans Album (1975, with Tony Bennett)
His Last Concert In Germany (recorded 1980, released 1989)

By others
 Cannonball Adderley – Know What I Mean? (1961)
 Johnny Hartman - The Voice That Is! (1964) 
 Earl Klugh - Earl Klugh (album) (1976)
 David Benoit - This Side Up (1985), Standards (2006) and Heroes (2008)
 Chick Corea and Gary Burton – The New Crystal Silence (2008)
 John McLaughlin – Time Remembered: John McLaughlin Plays Bill Evans (1993)
 Oscar Peterson – Affinity (1962)
 Don Sebesky – I Remember Bill: The Tribute to Bill Evans (1999)
 Ralph Towner – Open Letter (1991)
 Ellyn Rucker - This Heart of Mine (1989)

Notes

External links
"Waltz for Debby" at jazzstandards.com

1956 songs
1950s jazz standards
Songs with lyrics by Gene Lees